Americans in India comprise immigrants from the United States living in India, along with Indian citizens of American descent. They have a history stretching back to the late 18th century.

History
During World War II, more than 400,000 American soldiers were sent to India.

After the end of British colonial rule in India in 1947, the "colonial third culture" surrounding employment, which featured expatriates in superior roles, natives in subordinate roles, and little informal socialisation between the two, began to be replaced with a "co-ordinate third culture", based around the common social life of Americans working in multinational corporations and their Indian colleagues. Americans who came to India for work slowly assimilated into this culture. Many companies in those days found they had difficulty retaining American employees with children; they found educational facilities at the high school level to be inadequate.

In a break from the long tradition of older American expatriates coming to India to manage local subsidiaries of American companies, a trend began in the 2000s of younger Americans taking jobs at Indian companies, especially in the information technology sector, often at lower wages than they had previously earned in the U.S. In 2006 there were estimated to be roughly 800 American immigrants working in high-tech companies in India.

Numbers
According to a White House press release on 26 June 2017, over 700,000 U.S. citizens reside in India.

In 2002, one widely cited estimate stated that 60,000 Americans including African Americans lived in India. However, exact numbers were difficult to come by because many did not register with the embassy. Some media reports around the time of the 2008 U.S. presidential election stated that 10,000 Americans lived in India at the time. However this conflicted with another figure given by the head of the U.S. consulate in Mumbai, who estimated that there were 9,000 living in Mumbai and its surroundings alone, representing almost 0.1% of its total population.

In fiction
Outsourced aired on NBC during the 2010 television season, depicting an American manager at a call center in Mumbai.

Education
American schools in India include:
 American Embassy School (Delhi)
 American School of Bombay
 American International School Chennai

Notable people
This is a list of current and former U.S. citizens whose notability is related to their residence in India.

 Satyananda Stokes- Horticulturist, politician, Was part of Indian Freedom Struggle, First American arrested for involvement in Indian Independence movement 
 Akhil Akkineni, American actor of Indian descent, who works in Telugu films
Tom Alter, actor in the Indian cinema industry, former U.S. citizen
 Martha Chen, born and raised up in India but later became an American citizen
 Mary Curzon, Baroness Curzon of Kedleston, CI (27 May 1870 – 18 July 1906); as Vicereine of India, she held the highest official title in history of any American woman up to her time
 Monica Dogra, American singer and actor of Indian origin based in Mumbai
 Ellis R. Dungan, American director who worked in Tamil films
 Goa Gil, American-born musician, DJ, remixer and party organizer
 Lauren Gottlieb, actress and dancer  
 Nathaniel Higginson, Governor of Madras (1692–98)
Deva Katta, Indian-born film director who has later acquired U.S. citizenship, works in Telugu films
 Imran Khan, American actor of Indian origin, who works in Hindi films
 Akshay Oberoi, American actor of Indian origin, who works in Hindi films
 Jiah Khan, British-American actress and singer
 Dr. Anna Sarah Kugler, first medical missionary of the Evangelical Lutheran General Synod of the United States of North America
 Pooja Kumar, American actress born to Indian immigrants; works in the Tamil industry
 Justin McCarthy, American-born Indian Bharatnatyam dancer, instructor and choreographer
 Nandini Nimbkar, president of the Nimbkar Agricultural Research Institute (NARI)
 Alexx O'Nell, actor and singer 
 Joseph Allen Stein, American architect
 Samuel Evans Stokes, later Satyananda Stokes, came to India in 1904 to work at a leper colony in the Simla Hills, politician, freedofighter in India's Independence Movement
 Romulus Whitaker, herpetologist and wildlife conservationist, born in New York City, became an Indian citizen in 1975
 Elihu Yale, Governor of Madras Presidency (1684–85, 1687–92), founder of Yale University
 Gadwal Vijayalakshmi, Mayor of Greater Hyderabad Municipal Corporation (GHMC) since 2021. Indian-born former American citizen.
 Amit Jogi. Chhattisgarh MLA (2013–2018) from Marwahi, former American citizen.
John Packard (Grandfather of Actor Gavin Packard who came to India as a US Army veteran and stayed there.)

See also

Indian Americans
India–United States relations

References

Notes

Sources

Reviewed by

Further reading
Blood, Archer K. (2005). The cruel birth of Bangladesh: Memoirs of an American diplomat. Dhaka: University Press.

; a personal account from an unemployed American who moved to Sikkim to work as a newspaper editor

External links
Young Americans in India, a video report from CBS News

India
 
Americans
 
 
American emigration